The 2004–05 season was the 35th season in the history of Toulouse FC and the club's second consecutive season in the top flight of French football. In addition to the domestic league, Toulouse participated in this season's editions of the Coupe de France and the Coupe de la Ligue.

Competitions

Overall record

Ligue 1

League table

Results summary

Results by round

Matches

Coupe de France

Coupe de la Ligue

References

Toulouse FC seasons
Toulouse